Soundcheck is the thirty-third album by Finnish experimental rock band Circle. 

It was issued as a limited edition vinyl LP by Full Contact in 2009. It was recorded on 31 October 2009 in Lahti, Finland. The core four-piece Circle line-up is joined by sound engineer Tuomas Laurila who supplies effects and the original live sound mix, and guitarist brothers Julius and Pekka Jääskeläinen, creating a dense, guitar-heavy sound.

Soundcheck is one of a series of vinyl-only albums released by Circle which document their often improvised freeform live shows.

Track listing

Side A
Kukkakaalia kapteenit! (3:40)
Tuhatsata (20:39)
Side B
Virsi (9:25)
Nopeuskuningas (14:00)

Personnel
Jussi Lehtisalo
Tomi Leppänen
Mika Rättö
Janne Westerlund
Tuomas Laurila
Julius Jääskeläinen
Pekka Jääskeläinen

References

Circle (band) albums
2009 live albums